The Barry County Advertiser is a free weekly newspaper located in Cassville, Missouri, the county seat of Barry County, Missouri. The Advertiser is funded purely by advertising and is distributed through the U.S. Postal Service. The Advertiser is distributed each week to 13,500 homes across Barry County, and focuses on local news.

The first issue of the Advertiser was published on December 13, 1967, and was at that time one of three weekly papers in Cassville, a town with a population of 3,206 as of the 2020 census, but less than 3,000 at the time. Both of the existing papers, the Cassville Democrat and the Cassville Republican, had been in existence for nearly a century at that time, but in 1984, the 112-year-old Cassville Republican folded. Both the Advertiser and the Cassville Democrat continue to be published.

The paper was owned and founded by the late Missouri State Senator Emory Melton and his wife, Jean. The current owner is the Meltons' son, Stan Melton.

References 

Newspapers published in Missouri
Newspapers established in 1967
1967 establishments in Missouri